Western Swing & Waltzes and Other Punchy Songs is the third album by Canadian country and western artist Colter Wall. It was released on August 28, 2020 through La Honda Records and Thirty Tigers.

Track listing

Charts

Release history

References

2020 albums
Colter Wall albums
Thirty Tigers albums